Fred Chalenor (December 29, 1955 – June 23, 2018) was an American bassist, most recognized for his work in the bands Caveman Shoestore,  Tone Dogs, and Face Ditch. He also collaborated on numerous occasions with composer and keyboardist Wayne Horvitz, recording with him in Pigpen and Zony Mash, and with composer and percussionist Robert Mike Mahaffay of Tres Gone.

Biography
Fred Chalenor was born December 29, 1955, in Seattle, Washington. His first band was Zanzibar, a group led by guitarist Rick Adams based in Portland, Oregon. In 1978, Fred left the band overseas to perform in a folk duo. After that project disintegrated, he moved back to the United States and performed alongside musicians such as Henry Kaiser and Owen Maercks in the Bay Area. Chalenor's first studio performance credit was on Owen Maercks' eponymous debut released in 1978.

Chalenor had met fellow musicians Neil Minturn and Henry Franzoni when he was still performing in Zanzibar. Together, they formed Face Ditch in February 1979 who based themselves in the Portland area, moving to Seattle in 1981 and then Franzoni and Chalenor moving to NYC in 1983. The group broke up numerous times over their existence and issued two self-released cassettes (In the Interim and All Fall Down). Chalenor and Franzoni remained the only consistent members until the band finally parted ways in early 1985 after a show in New York City. In 2000, the original line-up reunited and digitally released their first official album in 2004.

Chalenor died on June 23, 2018.

Discography

References
General

 

Notes

External links

1955 births
2018 deaths
Curlew (band) members
Tone Dogs members
Musicians from Seattle
American rock bass guitarists
Guitarists from Washington (state)
American male bass guitarists
20th-century American bass guitarists
20th-century American male musicians